Xanthoconium purpureum is a species of bolete fungus in the genus Xanthoconium. It was described as new to science in 1962 by Wally Snell and Esther Dick in 1962. It is found in eastern North America, where it fruits under oak, sometimes in oak-pine forests.

See also
List of North American boletes

References

External links

Boletaceae
Fungi described in 1962